Birchwood is an unincorporated community located in the town of West Kewaunee, Kewaunee County, Wisconsin, United States.

References

Unincorporated communities in Kewaunee County, Wisconsin
Unincorporated communities in Wisconsin